Saint-Martin-du-Manoir is a commune in the Seine-Maritime department in the Normandy region in northern France.

Geography

Heraldry

Population
As of 2017, there are 611 homes in Saint-Martin-du-Manoir, of which 596 main residences, 1 second or seasonal home, and 14 vacant homes.

Places of interest
 The church of St. Martin, dating from the thirteenth century.
 The ruins of a sixteenth-century chateau.

See also
Communes of the Seine-Maritime department

References

Communes of Seine-Maritime